Firebaugh High School is a public high school in Firebaugh, California, United States. It is a part of the Firebaugh-Las Deltas Unified School District.

Athletics 
Firebaugh's athletic teams are nicknamed the Eagles and the school's colors are red, white, and blue. Firebaugh teams compete in the following sports:

Football
Boys basketball
Girls basketball
Girls soccer
Boys soccer
Boys wrestling
Girls wrestling
Baseball
Softball
Cross country
Boys tennis
Girls tennis
Track and field
Boys volleyball
Girls volleyball

Notable alumni
Josh Allen (quarterback), 7th pick in 2018 NFL Draft

Demographics
During the 2018–2019 school year, Firebaugh enrolled 671 students. 643 identified as Hispanic, 23 identified as Caucasian, and three identified as African-American.

References

External links
 

High schools in Fresno County, California
Public high schools in California